Stella Ewa Orłowska (born 1935) is a Polish logician whose research centers on the concept that everything in logic and set theory can be expressed in terms of relations, and who has used this idea to publish works on topics including deduction systems and model theory for non-classical logic, and logics of non-deterministic and incomplete information.

Education and career
Orłowska studied mathematics at the University of Warsaw, earning her master's degree in 1957 and a Ph.D. in 1971. The dissertation, Theorem Proving Systems, was supervised by Helena Rasiowa. She completed her habilitation there in 1978, with the habilitation thesis Resolution Systems and their Applications.

She was a researcher for the Polish Academy of Sciences from 1959 to 1966, and an assistant professor of mathematics at the University of Warsaw from 1971 to 1979. From 1980 to 1996 she returned to the Polish Academy of Sciences, with positions equivalent to associate and then full professor. She has been a professor at the National Institute of Telecommunications since 1996.

She chaired the editorial board of the journal Studia Logica from 1989 to 1991, and served as president of the Polish Association for Logic and Philosophy of Science from 1996 to 1999.

Books
Orłowska is the author of books including:
Systemy Herbranda dowodzenia twierdzeń rachunku predykatów [Herbrand systems for proving theorems of predicate calculus] (Państwowe Wydawnictwo Naukowe, 1976)
Incomplete Information: Structure, Inference, Complexity (with S. Demri, Springer, 2002)
Dual Tableaux: Foundation, Methodology, Case Studies (with Joanna Golińska-Pilarek, Springer, 2011)
Dualities for Structures of Applied Logics (with Anna Maria Radzikowska and Ingrid Rewitzky, College Publications, 2015)
She has also edited many volumes of collected papers, including several volumes commemorating the works of Helena Rasiowa and Zdzisław Pawlak. The book Ewa Orłowska on Relational Methods in Logic and Computer Science, edited by Joanna Golińska-Pilarek and Michal Zawidski, was published by Springer in 2018 in their Outstanding Contributions to Logic book series.

References

External links

1935 births
Living people
Polish logicians
20th-century Polish mathematicians
21st-century Polish mathematicians
Polish women mathematicians
20th-century Polish philosophers
21st-century Polish philosophers
Polish women philosophers
University of Warsaw alumni
Academic staff of the University of Warsaw
20th-century Polish women